David Eisner may refer to:

 David Eisner (chief executive), American business and political official
 David Eisner (actor) (born 1958), Canadian actor
 David A. Eisner (born 1955), professor of cardiac physiology